Red Hills is a historic home and farm complex located near Charlottesville, Albemarle County, Virginia.  It consists of a two-story, five bay brick main section built about 1797 in the Georgian style, and two brick rear wings.  It has a modern, one-story frame wing.  The front facade features one-story, gabled portico of Colonial Revival design added about 1939. Also on the property are a contributing barn (early-20th century), corncrib and shed (early-20th century), shed (late-19th century), well (19th century), and slave cemetery (19th century).

It was added to the National Register of Historic Places in 1998.

Slave Population 
According to the 1850 census, Red Hills Plantation was tended by a labor force of 24 slaves; many of these slaves lie in the slave cemetery, previously a part of the Red Hills property.

References

Houses on the National Register of Historic Places in Virginia
Colonial Revival architecture in Virginia
Houses completed in 1797
Houses in Albemarle County, Virginia
National Register of Historic Places in Albemarle County, Virginia